The following is a discography of production by David Banner, an American hip hop recording artist and record producer.

Singles produced 
2002
"Thug Holiday" (Trick Daddy)
2003
"Rubberband Man" (T.I.)
2005
"Walk It, Talk It" (Yung Wun featuring David Banner)
"Ain't Got Nothing" (featuring Magic & Lil Boosie)
2007 
"They Like Me" (Shop Boyz)
"Make Em Mad" (Chopper City Boyz)
2008
"Get Like Me" (featuring Chris Brown & Yung Joc)
"Shawty Say" (featuring Lil Wayne)

2001

Ruff Ryders – Ryde or Die Vol. 3: In the "R" We Trust 
 7. "Rock Bottom"

2003

Nappy Roots – Wooden Leather 
 2. "Nappy Roots Day"

T.I. – Trap Muzik 
 8. "Rubberband Man"

2004

Chingy – Powerballin' 
 10. "All the Way to St. Lou" (featuring Nate Dogg & David Banner)

Mannie Fresh – The Mind of Mannie Fresh 
 4. "Go With Me" (featuring Birdman)

T.I. – Urban Legend 
 12. "Countdown"

Yung Wun – The Dirtiest Thirstiest 
 10. "Walk It, Talk It" (featuring David Banner)

2005

Chamillionaire – The Longest Yard (soundtrack) 
 9. "Talkin' That Talk" (featuring David Banner)

David Banner – Certified 
 1. "Lost Souls"
 4. "2 Fingers" (featuring Jagged Edge)
 7. "Thinking of You" (featuring Case)
 9. "Certified" (featuring Marcus)
 10. "Ain't Got Nothing" (featuring Magic & Lil Boosie)
 11. "Bloody War" (featuring B.G.)
 13. "Take Your" (featuring Too Short, Bun B, & Talib Kweli)
 14. "My Life" (featuring Sky)
 16. "X-ed" (featuring Kamikaze)
 17. "Crossroads" (featuring Grout)

2006

Jibbs – Jibbs Featuring Jibbs 
 1. "Yeah Boii"

Tha Dogg Pound – Cali Iz Active 
 13. "Fakeass Hoes" (featuring David Banner)

2007

Chopper City Boyz – We Got This 
 4. "Make Em Mad"

Shop Boyz – Rockstar Mentality 
 4. "They Like Me"

2008

David Banner – The Greatest Story Ever Told 
 3. "Suicide Doors" (featuring UGK & Kandi Girl)
 6. "Get Like Me" (featuring Chris Brown & Yung Joc)
 7. "Shawty Say" (featuring Lil Wayne)
 9. "Syrup Sippin' (Banner Beat Break)" 
 10. "Hold On" (featuring Marcus)
 11. "Cadillac On 22's Part 2"
 12. "Uncle Swacc (Interlude)"
 15. "B.A.N. (The Love Song)"
 17. "Marz (Banner Beat Break)"
 19. "K.O."
 20. "Fly" (featuring Jazze Pha)
 22. "Wealth (Banner Beat Break)"

Lil Wayne – Tha Carter III 
 13. "La La" (featuring Brisco & Busta Rhymes)
 14. "Pussy Monster"

Mary Mary – The Sound 
 4. "Superfriend" (featuring David Banner)

Bobby Digital – Digi Snacks 
 4. "Straight Up the Block"

Maroon 5 – Call and Response: The Remix Album 
 8. "Wake Up Call" (feat. David Banner)

2009

Dorrough – Dorrough Music 
 6. "Never Changed" (feat. Tomeka Pearl)

Young Money – We Are Young Money 
 14. "Street Is Watchin'"

2010

8Ball & MJG – Ten Toes Down 

 03. "I Don't Give A F*ck" (feat. Bun B)

2011

Snoop Dogg – Doggumentary 
 20. "It's D Only Thing" (Produced with THX)

Chris Brown – Boy In Detention 
 02. "Crazy"
 11. "Ladies Love Me (featuring Justin Bieber)

Various artists – Footloose 
12. "Dance the Night Away" (performed by David Banner)

2013

Lil Wayne – I Am Not a Human Being II 
19. "Shit Stains" (Bonus Track) (produced with Swiff D)

Hustle Gang – G.D.O.D. (Get Dough Or Die) 
20. "Chasing Me" (featuring Iggy Azalea, T.I., Young Dro & Kris Stephens)

Lecrae – Church Clothes Vol. 2 
6. "Let It Whip" (featuring Paul Wall) – (co-produced with Héctor Delgado)

2015

Ludacris – Ludaversal 
01. "Ludaversal Intro"

Jill Scott – Woman 
08. "Closure"

Ne-Yo – Non-Fiction 
10. "Religious"

Pimp C – Long Live the Pimp 
10. "True to the Game" (featuring David Banner)

Miscellaneous 
 Lil Wayne
 "Never Get It"
 Maino
 "Don't Be Scared" (featuring Chris Brown)

External links
Allmusic
Discogs

Production discographies
 
 
Hip hop discographies